Marly Youmans (born Susan Marlene Youmans; November 22, 1953 in Aiken, South Carolina) is an American poet, novelist and short story writer. Her work reflects certain recurring themes such as nature, magic, faith and redemption, and often references visual art.

Background 
Marly Youmans grew up in Louisiana, North Carolina, and elsewhere. She currently lives in the village of Cooperstown, New York, with her husband and three children. She graduated from Hollins College, Brown University, and University of North Carolina at Chapel Hill.  She taught at State University of New York but quit academia after receiving promotion and tenure in her fifth year.

Writing 
Her published work consists of five books of poetry, eight novels and two fantasies for young readers, as well as uncollected short stories, essays and poems. Across all these idioms, her work displays a commitment to rhythm, the sound of words, imagery and complexity of form and allusion. Thaliad, for example, is an epic poem that tells a compelling story of children who survive an apocalypse to begin a new society, written as though a spoken history remembranced in blank verse a generation on. Her novels have been described as 'literary fiction at its finest' in Books and Culture while The Advocate has cited her skill at mastering poetic forms. The editor of Books and Culture says, "Youmans (pronounced like 'yeoman' with an 's' added) is the best-kept secret among contemporary American writers."

Her books demonstrate a number of continuing interests: in lives lived close to nature, whether in the past (Catherwood) or the future (Thaliad), magic, faith and redemption (Val/Orson, The Foliate Head) and the individual’s journey from youth to adulthood (Inglewood, A Death at the White Camelia Orphanage). Visual art is often referenced in her work and Charis in the World of Wonders, The Book of the Red King, Thaliad, The Foliate Head, Glimmerglass, and Maze of Blood were collaborations with the artist Clive Hicks-Jenkins with decorations throughout the texts. She provided the title poems for an illustrated anthology, The Book of Ystwyth: Six Poets on the Art of Clive Hicks-Jenkins.

Awards 
Youmans has been awarded many "book of the year" and "best of the year" citations by magazines, newspapers, and organizations. She is the winner of The Michael Shaara Award for Excellence in Civil War Fiction for The Wolf Pit, her third novel, which was also on the short list for The Southern Book Award.  She is a two-time winner of the Theodore Hoepfner Award for the short story and the winner of the New Writers Award of Capital Magazine (New York), also for the short story. Her latest awards are The Ferrol Sams Award for Fiction and the Silver in fiction, ForeWord BOTYA Awards for A Death at the White Camellia Orphanage (Mercer University Press, 2012.) Glimmerglass and Maze of Blood were ForeWord BOTYA finalists. She has held fellowships from Yaddo, New York State, and elsewhere.

She was a judge of the 2012 National Book Awards.

Bibliography

Novels 
 Little Jordan (Boston: David R. Godine, 1995)  (reprint Tempest, 1996)
  (reprint Bard 1997)
    (reprint Harcourt, 2003) 
 Val/Orson (Hornsea, UK: P. S. Publishing, 2009)  1-906301-51-4 / 9781906301514 (UK) dual jacketed/unjacketed limited editions
A Death at the White Camellia Orphanage (Macon: Mercer University Press, 2012) 0881462713 / 9780881462715 (hardcover/paperback/ebook)
Glimmerglass (Macon: Mercer University Press, 2014)  (hardcover)
Maze of Blood (Macon: Mercer University Press, 2015)  (hardcover)
Charis in the World of Wonders (San Francisco: Ignatius Press, 2020) (Sythe-sewn softbound with French flaps)

Poetry 
 Claire: poems (Louisiana State University, 2003),  (dual hard/softcover)
 The Throne of Psyche (Mercer University Press - Poetry, 2011)   (dual hard/softcover)
The Foliate Head (UK: Stanza Press, 2012) 
Thaliad (Montreal, CA: Phoenicia Publishing, 2012)  (dual hard/softcover)
The Book of the Red King (Montreal: Phoenicia Publishing, 2019)   (dual hard/softcover)

Books for young adults 
   (reprint Firebird, 2006)
  (reprint Firebird)

Essays 
 'Fire in the Labyrinth' in Simon Callow, Andrew Green, Rex Harley, Clive Hicks-Jenkins, Kathe Koja, Anita Mills, Montserrat Prat, Jacqueline Thalmann, Damian Walford Davies and Marly Youmans, Clive Hicks-Jenkins (2011: Lund Humphries) , pp. 99–123

References

Reviews
 Matthew Gilbert, "Lyrical Prose for a Coming of Age" (Little Jordan), The Boston Globe, December 31, 1995
 Philip Gambone, "Another Part of the Forest" (review of Catherwood), The New York Times Book Review, May 26, 1996
 Paula Friedman, "Fiction" (Catherwood) in The Washington Post, September 14, 1997
 Fred Chappell, "Catherwood," The Raleigh News and Observer, June 23, 1996
 Catherwood in Entertainment Weekly, March 14, 2014
 Bob Summer, "Novel of Civil War Soldier and Slave Transcends Genre" (The Wolf Pit), The Orlando Sentinel, February 10, 2002
 "The Wolf Pit" (starred review) at Publishers Weekly, 2001
 John Wilson, "The Top Ten Books of 2003" (The Curse of the Raven Mocker), Books and Culture Magazine, December 2003
 Greg Langley, Books Editor, "YA titles include very good books" (Ingledove, Best YA Fiction of 2005, TBRA) The Baton Rouge Advocate, June 5, 2005
 John Wilson, "Favorite Books of 2009" (Val/Orson, Book of the Year), Books and Culture Magazine, December 2009
 Randy Hoyt, "The Throne of Psyche," Mythprint of the Mythopoeic Society, 48:9 (350), September 2011
 John M. Formy-Duval, "A Death at the White Camellia Orphanage," About.com Contemporary Literature, 2012
 D. G. Myers, "Meursault goes home again" (A Death at the White Camellia Orphanage), A Commonplace Blog, December 12, 2012
 John Wilson, "Glimmerglass: A new novel by the 'best-kept secret among contemporary American writers,'" Books and Culture Magazine, November 2014
 Midori Snyder, "The Sublime Collaboration of Author Marly Youmans and Artist Clive Hicks-Jenkins: Thaliad," In the Labyrinth, October 18, 2012
 Rachel Barenblat, "Marly Youmans' Thaliad," Velveteen Rabbi, January 8, 2013
 Tom Atherton, "Glimmerglass by Marly Youmans," Strange Horizons, March 25, 2015
 Suzanne Brazil, "Glimmerglass, a Novel by Marly Youmans,", The Seattle Post-Intelligencer, January 19, 2015
 Jessica Hooten Wilson "The Recommendations of an Avid Reader" (The Book of the Red King), Fathom, December 18, 2019
 Ben Steelman, "A novel turn, rich and strange" (Glimmerglass), The Wilmington Star, November 9, 2014
 Midori Snyder, "An Early Review of Maze of Blood by Marly Youmans," pre-pub review at In the Labyrinth, February 24, 2015
 Suzanne Brazil, "Maze of Blood: A Novel by Marly Youmans," Blogcritics, December 28, 2015
 Jessica Hooten Wilson, "The Recommendations of an Avid Reader" at Fathom (The Book of the Red King), December 18, 2020

External links
Marly Youmans blog and website
Seven videos by Paul Digby of poems by Marly Youmans, Pinterest
Interview at Seattle Post-Intelligencer, Part One, Part Two, February 17, 2015
Interview, "The Pop Quiz at the End of the Universe: Marly Youmans," Tor.com, October 23, 2014
Interview, "Author Spotlight: Marly Youmans, Lightspeed, February 2013
Interview at Clarkesworld Magazine, May 2010
Interview, "Marly Youmans discussed her novel, 'The Wolf Pit,'" Civil War Book Review, Fall 2002

 

Living people
20th-century American novelists
21st-century American novelists
American women novelists
American women short story writers
People from Aiken, South Carolina
American women poets
Hollins University alumni
Brown University alumni
University of North Carolina at Chapel Hill alumni
State University of New York faculty
1953 births
20th-century American women writers
21st-century American women writers
20th-century American poets
21st-century American poets
20th-century American short story writers
21st-century American short story writers
Novelists from New York (state)
American women academics